Isla de Coche (Coche Island) is one of three islands forming the Nueva Esparta State of Venezuela, located in the Caribbean between Isla Margarita and the mainland. The other two islands are Isla Margarita, the main island of the state, and Cubagua, the smallest. Coche is coterminous with the municipality of Villalba, with the municipal seat at San Pedro de Coche, the largest town. Moreover, Coche Island has continue to sustain the fishing tradition.

Other towns on Coche besides San Pedro de Coche are El Bichar, Guinima, El Amparo, El Guamache and La Uva.

The economy depends mainly on tourism.

History 

The island was discovered in 1498 by Christopher Columbus, populated by the Waika Rio indigenous people. First efforts to settle Coche was made in the early 16th century. There was previous population of refugees originating from the city of Nueva Cádiz which was destroyed by a tropical storm on Cubagua Island. All settlers, mostly the pearl daughters, abandoned Isla Coche in 1574.

The next successful settlement took place in the 19th century, and from this date Coche is still inhabited.

The island is contained as the municipality of Villalba, with both having San Pedro de Coche as their capital.

Airport 
Location
City:  	Isla De Coche, Venezuela
Name:	Andrés Miguel Salazar Marcano Airport
ICAO:	SVIE

Details
Type:	Airport (Aerodrome, Airfield)
Latitude:	10°47'40"N (10.794406)
Longitude:	63°58'54"W (-63.981589)
Datum:	WGS 1984
Elevation:	10 ft (3 m)
Runways:	1
Longest:	3937 × 98 ft (1200 × 30 m)

Tourism
Coche Island is uniquely positioned for quality selective tourism (not massive). To the west of the island the conditions for windsurfing and kiteboarding (strong winds over 50 km/h with a sea without waves) and trucks candle can be cited among the best in the world. It can see the effect of strong winds and continued in the sparse vegetation of the island, as seen in the image of San Pedro de Coche. On the road can be practiced the cycling, naturally with sunscreen to prevent sunburn, given the absence of clouds over the year. The temperature, though high, is pleasant in the fresh sea air, considering that breeze rages precisely in the hottest hours of the afternoon.

On the island, there are good quality hotels that offer tourists all the necessary facilities for a pleasant stay. It also offers rides and tours both aquatic and terrestrial. Tourist purposes, Coche Island maintains close communication with Margarita Island and the Venezuelan mainland Sucre State.

In fiction 

The story of the Polish writer Arkady Fiedler's novel "Robinson's Island" (Wyspa Robinsona, 1954) took place in Coche Island. The protagonist Jan (John) Bober, a half-Polish half-English Virginia pioneer, fled from government pursuit by a pirate ship. However it ran into heavy water and wrecked near the island. Jan and his two Arawak companions Arnak and Wagura (former slaves from the ship), the only survivors of the shipwreck, lived in 1725–1726 in the island. Later they received in the island a group of fled slaves from Margarita Island and with combined forces defeated Spanish slaver pursuers and seized their ship. Fearing Spanish revenge, Jan and his followers left the island on the captured ship. Their adventures continued in the two next Arkady Fiedler's novels "Orinoco" (Orinoko, 1957) and "The White Jaguar" (Biały Jaguar, 1980).

References

External links 

  Airport information

Geography of Nueva Esparta
Venezuelan islands of the Leeward Antilles